The Siberia Cup was a professional tennis tournament played on indoor hardcourts. The event was part of the ATP Challenger Tour and the ITF Women's Circuit. It was classified as a $50k ITF Women's Circuit tournament, and was held in Tyumen, Russia, from 2011 to 2013.

Past finals

Men's singles

Men's doubles

Women's singles

Women's doubles

External links
ITF search

 
Siberia Cup
Siberia Cup
Hard court tennis tournaments
Tennis tournaments in Russia
Sport in Tyumen
Recurring sporting events established in 2011
Recurring sporting events disestablished in 2013